Hormorini is a weevil tribe in the subfamily Entiminae.

Genera 
Agasphaerops – Andringitrabius – Anillobius – Brachymycterus – Esmelina – Eusomostrophus – Evadodes – Evadomorpha – Evas – Genavius – Guineobius – Holcorhinosoma – Hormorus – Isopterus – Lathrotiorrhynchus – Leptorhinus – Lupinocolus – Myogalus – Ochrometa – Styliscus – Styreus

References 

 Van Dyke, E.C. 1936: New species of North American Weevils in the family Curculionidae, subfamily Brachyrhininae, IV. The Pan-Pacific entomologist, 12(1): 19–32.
 Alonso-Zarazaga, M.A.; Lyal, C.H.C. 1999: A world catalogue of families and genera of Curculionoidea (Insecta: Coleoptera) (excepting Scolytidae and Platypodidae). Entomopraxis, Barcelona

External links 

Entiminae
Beetle tribes